Alpha 9 is a science fiction anthology edited by American writer Robert Silverberg, first published in 1978.

Contents
Introduction by Robert Silverberg
"Dumb Waiter" by Walter M. Miller, Jr.
"The Monsters" by Robert Sheckley
"The Sliced-Crosswise Only-On-Tuesday World" by Philip Jose Farmer
"The Funeral" by Kate Wilhelm
"The Book" by Michael Shaara
"Dusty Zebra" by Clifford D. Simak
"Goodlife" by Fred Saberhagen
"Nobody's Home" by Joanna Russ

References
 Goodreads listing for Alpha 9
 MIT Science Fiction Society's Library Pinkdex Entry for Alpha 9

1978 anthologies
Science fiction anthologies
Robert Silverberg anthologies
Berkley Books books